Speed Label is the record company of Morly Grey. Started in 1969 by Paul Cassidy, Randy Byron and Mark and Tim Roller. Their first release was "Sleepy Softness" and "Yas" on 45rpm. In 1972 they released their first album (originally titled "The First Supper") but later changed to "The Only Truth" on the (unpublished) Starshine Records. After thirty years of modest success through bootlegs of the album by various labels in several countries, Morly Grey resurrected the original Speed Label in 2005. In 2009 the label negotiated with Sundazed Records to remaster and reissue The Only Truth with previously unreleased bonus tracks.

History
Started in 1969 in Alliance,Ohio by Morly Grey for their first 45rpm single "Yas/Sleepy Softness". In 1972 the label entered into a distribution agreement with Morly Grey's manager Floyd Philips to distribute their first album LP "The Only Truth", and some singles, on his Starshine Records Label (which Morly Grey produced and self-published). In 1973 the band released the LP " The Roller Bros.Band " on their subsidiary vanity label "RBB Records". Released " The Only Truth " on CD in 2005 and "The First Supper" CD Single in 2008. In 2009 signed an exclusive contract for the remastering and reissuing of "The Only Truth" with Sundazed Records. In 2009 the label is remastering all previously unreleased material for possible future releases.

Move to Las Vegas
In 2005 Speed Label reorganized under Paul Cassidy's brother, Rick, in Las Vegas,NV. Rick also runs the publishing company ( Morly Grey Publishing ASCAP ). The  surviving owners ( Mark and Tim Roller ) still remain in Alliance,Ohio.

Discography

Albums
  The Roller Bros.Band , LP, RBB Records/Speed Label, Morly Grey (1973)
  The Only Truth ,CD, Speed Label, Morly Grey (2005)

Singles
 "Yas/Sleepy Softness" 45rpm, Speed Label, Morly Grey (1969)
 "The First Supper" ( Be Your King/I'll Space You ) CD Single, Speed Label,  Morly Grey (2005)

Unreleased
 "RAW" ( Live Recordings ), Morly Grey (1973)
 "RAW" ( Live Music Video ), Morly Grey (1973)
 "Reunion" ( Studio Recordings ), Morly Grey (1995–1997)

References

External links

Morly Grey
Morly Grey at UBL

American independent record labels